West Dunbartonshire is a county constituency of the House of Commons of the Parliament of the United Kingdom. It elects one Member of Parliament (MP) by the first past the post system of election and covers the same area as the county of West Dunbartonshire.

The current constituency was first used in the 2005 general election. There was also an earlier West Dunbartonshire constituency, from 1950 to 1983.

The current MP is Martin Docherty-Hughes of the Scottish National Party, who was elected at the 2015 general election and was re-elected at the 2017 general election and 2019 general election.

Boundaries

Historic 
The historic constituency was created under the House of Commons (Redistribution of Seats) Act 1949 and first used in the 1950 general election.

As created in 1950, the constituency was one of two covering the county of Dunbarton. The other was East Dunbartonshire. The two new constituencies replaced the earlier constituencies of Dunbartonshire and Dumbarton Burghs.

West Dunbartonshire covered the Helensburgh, Old Kilpatrick, and Vale of Leven districts of the county and the burghs of Cove and Kilcreggan, Dumbarton and Helensburgh.

For the 1951 general election the constituency boundaries were adjusted to take account of a change to the boundaries of the Old Kilpatrick district.

The results of the First Periodical Review of the Boundary Commission were implemented for the 1955 general election, but there was no change to the boundaries of West Dunbartonshire, and the boundaries of 1951 and 1955 were used also in the general elections of 1959, 1964, 1966 and 1970.

The results of the Second Periodical Review were implemented for the February 1974 general election. The review took account of population growth in the county of Dunbarton, caused by overspill from the city of Glasgow into the new town of Cumbernauld and elsewhere, and West Dunbartonshire became one of three constituencies covering the county. The other two were East Dunbartonshire and Central Dunbartonshire. West Dunbartonshire now covered the Helensburgh and Vale of Leven districts and the burghs of Cove and Kilcreggan, Dumbarton and Helensburgh.

February 1974 boundaries were used also for the general elections of October 1974 and 1979.

In 1975, under the Local Government (Scotland) Act 1973, Scottish counties were abolished in favour of regions and districts and islands council areas, and the county of Dunbarton was divided between several districts of the new region of Strathclyde. The Third Periodical Review took account of new local government boundaries and the results were implemented for the 1983 general election.

Current 

The existing constituency was created as a result of the Fifth Periodical Review of the Boundary Commission for Scotland, It covers and is entirely within the West Dunbartonshire council area.

The area of the constituency was previously divided between the Dumbarton and Clydebank and Milngavie constituencies. It includes the population centres of Clydebank, Dumbarton and Alexandria.

The Fifth Periodical Review did not affect the boundaries of Scottish Parliament constituencies, which retain the boundaries of Westminster constituencies prior to implementation of the results of the review.

Members of Parliament

Election results

Elections in the 2010s

1 Change to majority not meaningful as seat changed hands.

Elections in the 2000s

Elections in the 1970s

Elections in the 1960s

Elections in the 1950s

References 
Specific

General

Westminster Parliamentary constituencies in Scotland
Constituencies of the Parliament of the United Kingdom established in 1950
Constituencies of the Parliament of the United Kingdom disestablished in 1983
Constituencies of the Parliament of the United Kingdom established in 2005
Historic parliamentary constituencies in Scotland (Westminster)
Politics of West Dunbartonshire
Dunbartonshire
Dumbarton
Clydebank
Vale of Leven